Saint Disibod (619–c.700) was an Irish monk and hermit, first mentioned in a martyrologium by Hrabanus Maurus (9th century). Hildegard of Bingen around 1170 composed a Vita of Saint Disibod  He is commemorated on 8 September.

According to Hildegard's Vita sancti Dysibodi, Disibod came to the Frankish Empire in 640 as a missionary, accompanied by his disciples Giswald, Clemens and Sallust. They were active in the Vosges and Ardennes, until, guided by a dream, Disibod built a cell at the confluence of the rivers Nahe and Glan, the location of the later monastery of Disibodenberg.

Notes

External links

 "St. Disen, or Disibode, of Ireland, Bishop and Confessor", Butler's Lives of the Saints

619 births
700 deaths
7th-century Frankish saints
7th-century Irish priests
Medieval Irish saints on the Continent
Colombanian saints
People from Bad Kreuznach (district)